Ferah Ali Pasha was an Ottoman pasha sent to Circassia in order to maintain diplomatic relations between Circassia and the Ottoman Empire and spread Islam among the remaining Christian and Pagan tribes in Circassia.

Biography

Career 
In 1779 he was appointed to the Black Sea Coast of Circassia and built several forts and mosques. He was a devshirme of Georgian origin and was famous as a pious Muslim person. His life can be studied from the notes of Haşim Efendi and the History of Cevdet Pasha. Ferah Ali Pasha, who visited the region after settling in Soğucak, said in the letter he sent to Istanbul: “The people of this region are brave and honest people. If fortifications are made in the region, it will become a country like Crimea, it will put a strong barrier against the enemy."

Death 
Ferah Ali Pasha died in 1785.

References 

Georgians from the Ottoman Empire
1785 deaths
Pashas